The 2019–20 season was Morecambe's 96th season since formation and their 13th consecutive season in League Two, the fourth tier of English football. They finished 22nd in League Two, and also competed in the FA Cup, EFL Cup and EFL Trophy, where they were eliminated in the first round, second round and group stage respectively.

Pre-season
The Shrimps have announced they will face FC United of Manchester, Bamber Bridge, Barrow, Everton U23s, Marine and Accrington Stanley as part of their pre-season preparations.

Competitions

League Two

League table

Results summary

Results by matchday

Matches
On Thursday, 20 June 2019, the EFL League Two fixtures were revealed.

Coronavirus Suspension

On 13 March 2020, all professional football in England was suspended until at least 3 April 2020 due to the COVID-19 pandemic. Six days later, the suspension was extended to at least 30 April 2020. On 3 April 2020, the suspension was extended indefinitely.

On 11 May 2020, the Government released a document that stated that sport would not be able to resume before 1 June 2020 at the earliest, and only behind closed doors.

On 15 May 2020, the League Two clubs voted to end the season early, a decision that was ratified on 9 June.

This left Morecambe in 22nd place on 0.86 points per game, and safe to take their place in League Two for the 2020–21 season.

FA Cup

The draw for the First Round Proper was made on 21 October 2019 by Karen Carney (home teams) and Jermaine Beckford (away teams).

EFL Cup

The first round draw was made on 20 June. The second round draw was made on 13 August 2019 following the conclusion of all but one first round matches.

EFL Trophy

On 9 July 2019, the pre-determined group stage draw was announced with Invited clubs to be drawn on 12 July 2019.

Transfers

Transfers in

Loans in

Loans out

Transfers out

Footnotes

References

2019-20
Morecambe